Ukhta is the name of several inhabited localities in Russia.

Modern localities
Urban localities
Ukhta, a town in the Komi Republic; 
Kalevala, Russia, named Ukhta until 1963, an urban locality in the Republic of Karelia; 

Rural localities
Ukhta, Khabarovsk Krai, a selo in Ulchsky District of Khabarovsk Krai

Renamed localities
Ukhta, before 1963, name of Kalevala, an urban-type settlement in Kalevalsky District of the Republic of Karelia